Thomas Aloysius Gorman (January 4, 1925 – December 26, 1992) was an American professional baseball player. A right-handed pitcher, he played all or part of eight seasons in Major League Baseball, from  until , for the New York Yankees and Kansas City Athletics.

Gorman was a native of New York, New York, who grew up in Valley Stream, Long Island. He appeared in 289 MLB games pitched, but only 33 as a starting pitcher. He was credited with 18 saves, second in the American League, as a member of the 1955 Athletics, the team's first season in Kansas City.

In 689⅓ Major League innings pitched, Gorman surrendered 659 hits and 239 bases on balls, with 321 strikeouts.

Gorman died at his Valley Stream, New York, home on December 26, 1992.

References

External links

1925 births
1992 deaths
Binghamton Triplets players
Dallas Rangers players
Indianapolis Indians players
Kansas City Athletics players
Kansas City Blues (baseball) players
Major League Baseball pitchers
New York Yankees players
Newark Bears (IL) players
Norfolk Tars players
People from Valley Stream, New York
Portland Beavers players
Radford Rockets players
Baseball players from New York City
Valley Stream Central High School alumni
Burials at the Cemetery of the Holy Rood